The Satellite Launch Vehicle or SLV was a small-lift launch vehicle project started in the early 1970s by the Indian Space Research Organisation to develop the technology needed to launch satellites. The first experimental flight of SLV-3, in August 1979, was a failure. The first successful launch took place on 18 July 1980.

It was a four-stage rocket with all solid-propellant motors.

The first launch of the SLV took place in Sriharikota on 10 August 1979. The fourth and final launch of the SLV took place on 17 April 1983.

It has taken approximately seven years to realise the vehicle from start. The solid motor case for first and second stage are fabricated from 15 CDV6 steel sheets and third and fourth stages from fibre reinforced plastic.

Launch statistics

Launch history
All four SLV launches occurred from the SLV Launch Pad at the Sriharikota High Altitude Range. The first two launches were experimental (E) and the next 2 were designated as developmental (D) as this was the first launch vehicle being developed by India not intended for a long service life.

See also
 
 Comparison of orbital launchers families
 Timeline of artificial satellites and space probes

References

 https://web.archive.org/web/20071009040815/http://www.bharat-rakshak.com/SPACE/space-launchers-slv.html

Space programme of India
ISRO space launch vehicles
Microsatellite launch vehicles
Satish Dhawan Space Centre
Vehicles introduced in 1979